New English may refer to:

Modern English
Anglo-Irish people or New English people, settlers in Ireland
New English (EP), an EP by Ambulance LTD
New English (mixtape), by Desiigner

See also
New Englander
Old English

History of the English language